The Cedars is a historic residence in Washington, Georgia. It was added to the National Register of Historic Places on April 11, 1972. It is located at 201 Sims Street.

The original house on the site was built in c.1793;  its kitchen survives in the existing house.  The house includes Stick/Eastlake architecture.

See also
National Register of Historic Places listings in Wilkes County, Georgia

References

Houses on the National Register of Historic Places in Georgia (U.S. state)
Houses in Wilkes County, Georgia
Stick-Eastlake architecture in the United States